Francis Joseph "Bots" Nekola (December 10, 1906 – March 11, 1987) was an American professional baseball player and scout. The native of New York City was a left-handed pitcher who appeared in 11 games in Major League Baseball for the New York Yankees and Detroit Tigers.

Nekola attended Evander Childs High School and the College of the Holy Cross. He went from the Holy Cross campus to the Majors, appearing with the Yankees in nine games during their 1929 season, all in relief.  In his big league debut July 19, he pitched 2⅔ scoreless, one-hit innings against the Cleveland Indians.  Nekola made his first minor league appearance the following season, and his career would continue in the minors through 1938, interrupted only by a two-game trial with the 1933 Tigers.

Over eleven major league games, Nekola had a 0–0 record with a 5.85 earned run average. In 20 total innings pitched, he surrendered 25 hits and 16 bases on balls. He struck out two.

Following his playing career, he was the Boston Red Sox' longtime amateur scout in the New York and New Jersey regions. In that capacity, in 1959, Nekola scouted and signed future Baseball Hall of Fame outfielder Carl Yastrzemski. He also would sign future All-Star shortstop Rico Petrocelli as well as Chuck Schilling, a promising second baseman whose career was derailed by injury.

He died in Rockville Centre, New York.

References

External links

1906 births
1987 deaths
Boston Red Sox scouts
Detroit Tigers players
Holy Cross Crusaders baseball players
Jersey City Skeeters players
Louisville Colonels (minor league) players
Major League Baseball pitchers
New York Yankees players
Newark Bears (IL) players
St. Paul Saints (AA) players
Baseball players from New York City
Toledo Mud Hens players
Toronto Maple Leafs (International League) players
Wilkes-Barre Barons players
Burials at Gate of Heaven Cemetery (Hawthorne, New York)